Tony MacFarland (born Antonio José MacFarland on September 15, 1982, in Puebla, Puebla) is a Mexican actor and show host, who made his first appearance in television in the Mexican edition of the reality show Big Brother.

In 2003, he participated in the film Sexos prósperos, directed by Matha Luna, alongside Julio Bracho, and Consuelo Duval. He has also appeared in some television commercials. He is currently an administrator of a night club in his native city, called "Bios". Tony MacFarland also hosted Día de perros, alongside Vanessa Aguilar and Renato Bartilotti.

External links
 Profile  at esmas.com

1982 births
Living people
Mexican male film actors
Mexican television presenters
Mexican people of Scottish descent
People from Puebla (city)